Lazimi is a regular litany in Sufism.

Lazimi or Lazim may also refer to:
 Haji Mohd Lazim Bridge, a river bridge in Malaysia.
 Khalid Tawfik Lazim, an Iraqi sprinter.